The 1998 Cornell Big Red football team was an American football team that represented Cornell University during the 1998 NCAA Division I-AA football season. Cornell tied for second-to-last in the Ivy League. 

In its first season under head coach Pete Mangurian, the team compiled a 4–6 record and was outscored 200 to 159. John Hanson and Mike Hood were team captains. 

Cornell's 1–6 conference record tied for seventh place in the Ivy League standings. The Big Red were outscored 147 to 96 by Ivy opponents.

Cornell played its home games at Schoellkopf Field in Ithaca, New York.

Schedule

References

Cornell
Cornell Big Red football seasons
Cornell Big Red football